Hollow Creek is a home rule-class city in Jefferson County, Kentucky, United States. The population was 783 at the 2010 census.

Geography

Demographics

As of the census of 2000, there were 815 people, 309 households, and 262 families residing in the city. The racial makeup of the city was 93.74% White, 4.54% African American, 0.74% Native American, and 0.98% from two or more races. Hispanic or Latino of any race were 0.49% of the population.

There were 309 households, out of which 28.5% had children under the age of 18 living with them, 76.1% were married couples living together, 6.1% had a female householder with no husband present, and 14.9% were non-families. 13.9% of all households were made up of individuals, and 6.1% had someone living alone who was 65 years of age or older. The average household size was 2.64 and the average family size was 2.89.

In the city, the population was spread out, with 20.9% under the age of 18, 5.5% from 18 to 24, 22.5% from 25 to 44, 33.3% from 45 to 64, and 17.9% who were 65 years of age or older. The median age was 46 years. For every 100 females, there were 98.8 males. For every 100 females age 18 and over, there were 97.9 males.

The median income for a household in the city was $67,875, and the median income for a family was $70,625. Males had a median income of $47,500 versus $26,250 for females. The per capita income for the city was $25,508. None of the families and 0.4% of the population were living below the poverty line, including no under eighteens and 1.6% of those over 64.

References

Cities in Jefferson County, Kentucky
Cities in Kentucky
Populated places established in 1971
1971 establishments in Kentucky